This is a list of Bien de Interés Cultural landmarks in the Province of Valladolid, Spain.

 Castle of La Mota
 Castle of Torrelobatón
 Peñafiel Castle
 Portillo Castle
 Colegio de San Gregorio (National Sculpture Museum (Valladolid))
 Convent of Las Descalzas Reales (Valladolid)
 Church of Santa María La Antigua
 Church of San Benito el Real
 Church of San Pablo
 Monastery of Nuestra Señora del Prado
 Monastery of Santa María de Retuerta
 National Museum of Sculpture
 Plaza del Coso
 Royal Audiencia and Chancillería of Valladolid (Palacio de los Vivero/Los Vivero Palace)
 Valladolid Cathedral
 Valladolid Royal Palace
 Palace of Pimentel
 Palace of Santa Cruz
 Royal Convent of Santa Clara
 St Mary's Church, Wamba
 Valbuena Abbey

References 

 
Valladolid